Yan Jinhai (born March 1962) is a Chinese politician of Tibetan ethnicity who is the current deputy secretary of the Chinese Communist Party Tibet Committee and chairman of Tibet Autonomous Region, in office since 8 October 2021. Previously he served as party secretary of Lhasa, the capital of Tibet Autonomous Region.

He was a delegate to the 11th National People's Congress. He is a representative of the 19th National Congress of the Chinese Communist Party and an alternate members of the 19th Central Committee of the Chinese Communist Party.

Early life and education
Yan was born in Minhe Hui and Tu Autonomous County, Qinghai, in March 1962. In 1978, he enrolled at Qinghai University for Nationalities, majoring in Chinese. After graduating in 1982, he taught at Huangnan Normal School for Nationalities.

Career in Qinghai
He joined the Chinese Communist Party (CCP) in December 1983. He began his political career in November 1984, when he became an official in the Education Bureau of Huangnan Tibetan Autonomous Prefecture. In February 1990, he became deputy director of the Office of the CCP Huangnan Tibetan Autonomous Prefecture Committee, rising to director the next year. He served as deputy secretary-general of the CCP Huangnan Tibetan Autonomous Prefecture Committee in July 1993, and three years later promoted to the secretary-general position. At the same time, he was admitted to member of the standing committee of the CCP Huangnan Tibetan Autonomous Prefecture Committee, the prefecture's top authority.

He became deputy party secretary of Yushu Tibetan Autonomous Prefecture in June 1998 before being assigned to the similar position in Haibei Tibetan Autonomous Prefecture in January 2005. In February 2008, he was promoted to party secretary, the top political position in the prefecture. It would be his first job as "first-in-charge" of a prefecture. 

He was appointed vice governor of Qinghai in January 2013 and in May 2017 was admitted to member of the standing committee of the CCP Qinghai Provincial Committee, the province's top authority.

Career in Tibet
In July 2020, he was transferred to southwest China's Tibet Autonomous Region and appointed deputy party secretary, concurrently serving as party secretary of Lhasa since 18 January 2021. On 8 October 2021, he was appointed chairman of Tibet Autonomous Region, succeeding Che Dalha.

References

1962 births
Living people
People from Minhe Hui and Tu Autonomous County
Qinghai University for Nationalities alumni
People's Republic of China politicians from Qinghai
Chinese Communist Party politicians from Qinghai
Delegates to the 11th National People's Congress
Alternate members of the 19th Central Committee of the Chinese Communist Party
Members of the 20th Central Committee of the Chinese Communist Party